The Nandi Awards are the awards that recognise the excellence in Telugu cinema, Telugu theatre and Telugu television, and Lifetime achievements in Indian cinema. Presented annually by the Government of Andhra Pradesh, the award is named after the big granite bull at Lepakshi — a cultural and historical symbol of the Telugu people.

Nandi Awards are presented in four categories: Gold (Swarnam), Silver (Rajatam), Bronze (Kamsyam), and Copper (Raagi). A variant, the Nandi Natakotsavam Awards for Theatre, is also given every year by the government for social, mythological and poetic dramas.

History 
The Government of Andhra Pradesh commissioned the Nandi Film Awards to recognise and commend the best films produced in the Telugu language in Andhra Pradesh from 1964 onwards. The objective of the film awards is to encourage the production of films in the Telugu language with high technical excellence and aesthetic values bearing cultural, educational, and social relevance and also promoting the integration and unity of the nation. Awards are given annually and are presented in a public event on the Ugadi, Telugu New Year Day. The Government has transferred the activity relating to conferring Nandi Awards to the Film Television and Theatre Development Corporation. Since 1998, the awards are organised by them.

The Awards are given in the categories of feature films, feature films on national integration, children's films, documentary films, educational films, and books/articles on Telugu cinema in Telugu language for the best films, producers, directors, artistes, and technicians. The awards are usually in the form of Golden Nandi, Silver Nandi, Bronze Nandi, and Copper Nandi, in addition to medals, commendation certificates.

Selection criteria 
Annually, a state panel appointed by the Government of Andhra Pradesh selects the winning entry and the Chief Minister of Andhra Pradesh presents the awards in the award ceremony. A list of rules is presented every year in a document of regulations. The criteria for eligibility contains many clauses. Among them, there is a direct requirement that the film, and particularly films entering the competition, should be produced in Andhra Pradesh and Telangana, and in case of co-production involving a foreign entity, there are as many conditions which should be fulfilled in order for the film to qualify.

According to the criteria, in order to be eligible for consideration of the jury, a film should be certified by the Central Board of Film Certification between 1 January and 31 December. The Government do not have influence over which films are selected for consideration and which films ultimately win awards. However, there are strict criteria which are being scrutinised by the government as to whether a film is eligible for consideration by the jury panels.

Honorary Awards – Gold

Raghupathi Venkaiah Award 

The award is named after Raghupathi Venkaiah Naidu, and presented annually to "an eminent film personality for his outstanding contribution to Telugu cinema." (since 1980).

NTR National Award 

The NTR National Award is named in the memory of former chief minister and actor N. T. Rama Rao, and is presented to "an eminent film
personality every year for outstanding contribution to the growth and development of Indian Cinema." (since 1996).

BN Reddy National Award 
The award is named after director B. N. Reddy and is presented to "an eminent film Director for outstanding contribution to the growth and development of the Indian Cinema," annually from 2009. The awardee receives a cash price of 2 lakh, a special memento, citation and shawl.
 2008: K. B. Tilak (director and producer)
 2009: K. Raghavendra Rao (film director)
 2011: Shyam Benegal (film director)
 2012: Singeetam Srinivasa Rao (director and producer)
 2013: A. Kodandarami Reddy (director)
 2014: S. S. Rajamouli (director)
 2015: Trivikram Srinivas (director)
 2016: Boyapati Srinu (director)

Nagireddy–Chakrapani National Award 
Named after filmmakers, Nagi Reddi and Chakrapani, the award is presented annually since 2009 to "an eminent film Producer or Writer or Technician or Infrastructure provider to the film industry for outstanding growth and development of the Indian Cinema every year." The awardee receives a cash price of 2 lakh, a special memento, citation and shawl.
 2008: Akkineni Ramesh Prasad – (film producer)
 2009: Ramoji Rao – (film producer)
 2010: M. Saravanan and Balasubramanian
 2011: G. Adiseshagiri Rao – (film producer)
 2012: Daggubati Suresh Babu – (film producer)
 2013: Dil Raju – (film producer)
 2014: R. Narayan Reddy (producer)
 2015: M. M. Keeravani (music director)
 2016: K. S. Rama Rao (producer)

Gold 
 Best Feature Films – Gold, Silver and Bronze: since 1964
 Sarojini Devi Award for a Film on National Integration: since 1983
 Best Children Films – Gold and Silver: since 1978
 Best Documentary Films – Gold and Silver: since 1968
 Best Popular Feature Film: since 2005

Silver 
 Best Actor: since 1977
 Best Actress: since 1977
 Best Director: since 1981
 Akkineni Award for Best Home-viewing Feature Film: since 1991
 Best Educational Film: since 1981

Copper

Since 1977 
 Best Cinematographer: since 1977
 Best Music Director: since 1977
 Best Male Playback Singer: since 1977
 Best Female Playback Singer: since 1977
 Best Screenplay Writer: since 1978
 Best Lyricist: since 1977
 Best Story Writer: since 1965

Since 1981 
 Best Supporting Actor: since 1981
 Best Supporting Actress: since 1981
 Best Audiographer: since 1981

Since 1985 
 Best First Film of a Director: since 1981
 Best Character Actor: since 1994
 Best Character Actress: since 1994
 Best Male Comedian: since 1985
 Best Female Comedian: since 1999
 Best Dialogue Writer: since 1983
 Best Choreographer: since 1985
 Special Jury Award: since 1981

Others 
 Best Male Dubbing Artist: since 1997
 Best Female Dubbing Artist: since 1997
 Best Book on Telugu Cinema: since 1995
 Best Villain: since 1985
 Best Child Actor: since 1981
 Best Child Actress: since 1977
 Best Editor: since 1981
 Best Art Director: 1981
 Best Makeup Artist: since 1981
 Best Costume Designer: since 1985
 Best Fight Master: since 1999
 Best Film Critic on Telugu Cinema: since 1995
 Best Special Effects: since 2005

Criticism and controversies 
The Nandi Awards of 2014 have sparked a controversy where a few Telugu filmmakers have alleged political favouritism, casteism and negligence.

The producer of Race Gurram (2014), Nallamalupu Bujji felt that his film was ignored despite being "the biggest hit of 2014" as they did not indulge in lobbying. Bunny Vasu, a close associate of the Allu–Konidela family also echoed the same. Some have pointed out that the winners mainly belonged to the Kamma community. Gunasekhar, the director of 2015 film Rudhramadevi, in an open letter to the Government of Andhra Pradesh wrote: "Why wasn't Rudhramadevi considered for one of the three Best Feature Film awards, despite its subject, which highlighted the achievements of a queen? Wasn't it even good enough for a jury award?" Producer Bandla Ganesh dubbed the awards as "Cycle Awards" taking a dig at the symbol of then ruling Telugu Desam Party.

Responding to the allegations, Nara Lokesh, then IT minister and the son of the chief minister N. Chandrababu Naidu, asked why Hyderabad-based filmmakers were being critical of the state which they were not residents of. Actor-director Posani Krishna Murali returned his Nandi Award for Best Supporting Actor (2015), condemning Lokesh's comments. Chief minister Naidu said that he never expected that the awards would trigger so much controversy.

References 

 
Telugu cinema
Entertainment in India
Awards established in 1964
Nandi Award winners
Indian film awards
1964 establishments in Andhra Pradesh
Andhra Pradesh awards